The Whitsunday Times was a weekly newspaper covering the Whitsunday Shire in North Queensland, Australia. It continues on as digital-only masthead. 

Its circulation area includes Airlie Beach, Cannonvale, Proserpine, Bowen and surrounding suburbs and islands. 

It was published every Thursday, and an average of 7342 copies were distributed, sold or home delivered across the region.

It was published by News Corp Australia. It was formerly printed by Mackay Printing and Publishing, part of APN News & Media.

History 
It was founded in 1981 under the Airlie and Island News masthead.

Along with many other regional Australian newspapers owned by NewsCorp, the newspaper ceased print editions in June 2020 and became an online-only publication from 26 June 2020.

References

Holdings

External links
 The Whitsunday Times

Publications established in 1981
Newspapers published in Queensland
Weekly newspapers published in Australia
APN Australian Regional Media
News Corp Australia